Marian Chițescu (born 20 May 1971) is a Romanian bobsledder. He competed at the 1994 Winter Olympics and the 1998 Winter Olympics.

References

1971 births
Living people
Romanian male bobsledders
Olympic bobsledders of Romania
Bobsledders at the 1994 Winter Olympics
Bobsledders at the 1998 Winter Olympics
People from Bușteni